Stéphane Boyer (born c. 1988) is a Canadian politician. He was elected as mayor of Laval, Quebec in the 2021 mayoral election, succeeding Marc Demers. Elected at the age of 33, he is the youngest mayor in the history of the city.

Biography
Boyer grew up in the Pont-Viau neighbourhood of Laval. He is a graduate of a political communications program at Université du Québec à Montréal.

Before being elected as mayor, Boyer was a city councillor representing District 4 (Duvernay–Pont-Viau) on Laval City Council. He was first elected to council in the 2013 municipal elections and was re-elected in 2017. As a city councillor, he was involved in a number of local issues, including the upgrading of the entrance of the Viau Bridge. He then took on more responsibility as part of the city's executive council, eventually becoming the committee's vice president. He became leader of the Mouvement lavallois party in April 2021. 

Boyer also wrote a book called "Un Monde de Différences" ("A world of differences") and co-wrote "11 brefs essais pour des villes résilientes et durables" ("11 brief essays for resilient and sustainable cities").

References

External links 
Official website

French Quebecers
Mayors of Laval, Quebec

Université du Québec à Montréal alumni

1980s births

Living people

Year of birth uncertain